Zgornje Loke ( or) is a settlement in the Municipality of Lukovica in the eastern part of the Upper Carniola region of Slovenia. It lies on the main road from Ljubljana to Celje.

References

External links

Zgornje Loke on Geopedia

Populated places in the Municipality of Lukovica